Lawrence Watkins (born October 5, 1946 in Bessemer, Alabama) is a former American football running back in the National Football League for the Detroit Lions, Philadelphia Eagles, Buffalo Bills, and the New York Giants.  He played college football at Alcorn State University.

1946 births
Living people
American football running backs
Alcorn State Braves football players
Detroit Lions players
Philadelphia Eagles players
Buffalo Bills players
New York Giants players
Sportspeople from Bessemer, Alabama
Players of American football from Alabama